Nikolina Božičević (born 14 January 1995) is a Croatian volleyball player. She plays as libero for Romanian club CSM Târgoviște.

International career 
She is a member of the Croatia women's national volleyball team. She competed at the 2017 FIVB Volleyball World Grand Prix, and 2021 Women's European Volleyball League, winning a silver medal.

References

External links
Nikolina Božičević at CEV.eu

1995 births
Living people
Croatian women's volleyball players
Sportspeople from Zagreb
Expatriate volleyball players in Hungary
Expatriate volleyball players in Finland
Expatriate volleyball players in Romania
Mediterranean Games medalists in volleyball
Mediterranean Games gold medalists for Croatia
Competitors at the 2018 Mediterranean Games